Kang Seo-kyung and Kim Na-ri were the defending champions but decided not to participate together. Kang played alongside Yu Min-hwa, while Kim partnered up with Han Sung-hee. Both pairs lost in the quarterfinals.

Nigina Abduraimova and Venise Chan won the tournament, defeating Kim Ji-young and Yoo Mi in the final, 6–4, 2–6, [12–10].

Seeds

Draw

References 
 Draw

Samsung Securities Cup - Women's Doubles
2012 Women's Doubles